Chandrabindu (IAST: ,  in Sanskrit) is a diacritic sign with the form of a dot inside the lower half of a circle. It is used in the Devanagari (ँ), Bengali-Assamese, Gujarati (ઁ), Odia (ଁ), Telugu (ఁ), Javanese ( ꦀ) and other scripts.

It usually means that the previous vowel is nasalized.

In Hindi, it is replaced in writing by anusvara when it is written above a consonant that carries a vowel symbol that extends above the top line.

In Classical Sanskrit, it seems to occur only over a lla conjunct consonant, to show that it is pronounced as a nasalized double l, which occurs if -nl- have become assimilated in sandhi.

In Vedic Sanskrit, it is used instead of anusvara to represent the sound anunasika when the next word starts with a vowel. It usually occurs where in earlier times a word ended in -ans.

Unicode encodes chandrabindu and chandrabindu-like characters for a variety of scripts:

 
 
 
 
 
 
 
 
 
 
 
 
 
 
 
 
 
 
 
 
 
 
 
 
 
 
 
 
 
 
 
 
 
 
 
 
 
 

There is also a general-purpose combining diacritical mark COMBINING CANDRABINDU code point U+0310 (◌̐), but that is intended for use with Latin letters in transliteration of Indic languages.

See also
 Anusvara
 Fermata

References 

Brahmic diacritics